The Nakhodkinskoye gas field is a natural gas field located in the Yamalo-Nenets Autonomous Okrug. It was discovered in 2005 and developed by and Lukoil. It began production in 2005 and produces natural gas and condensates. The total proven reserves of the Nakhodkinskoye gas field are around 8.828 trillion cubic feet (250×109m³), and production is slated to be around 602 million cubic feet/day (17×105m³) in 2010.

References

Natural gas fields in Russia